This is a list of seasons competed by the Melbourne Football Club.  The team was founded in 1858, and was fundamental in developing the rules of Australian rules football and organizing the first competitions.  Melbourne was a founding member of the Victorian Football Association (VFA) in 1877, which, alongside the South Australian Football Association (SAFA), were the first ever Australian rules football associations.  In 1897, Melbourne was a founding member of the breakaway Victorian Football League (VFL) – renamed the Australian Football League (AFL) in 1990 – which they have remained in ever since.

In their long history, Melbourne have had long periods of success but also long periods of failure.  During the 9 VFA premiership seasons in which Melbourne took part, they never won the premiership.  They have won the VFL premiership 13 times, most recently in 2021, which was the club's first premiership since 1964.  After their 1964 premiership, Melbourne missed the finals for 22 consecutive seasons, the 3rd longest such drought in VFL/AFL history.

Seasons 

Notes

All-time win–loss records

Footnotes

References 

Melbourne Football Club
Melbourne Football Club seasons
Australian rules football-related lists